Robert John Braidwood (29 July 1907 – 15 January 2003) was an American archaeologist and anthropologist, one of the founders of scientific archaeology, and a leader in the field of Near Eastern Prehistory.

Life
Braidwood was born July 29, 1907, in Detroit, Michigan, the first child of Walter John Braidwood (ca. 1876) and Reay Nimmo (1881), and was educated at the University of Michigan, from where he graduated with an M.A. in architecture in 1933.  Within a year he had joined the University of Chicago Oriental Institute's expedition to the Amuq Plain with the archaeologist James Henry Breasted.  He worked with the expedition until 1938, during which time he married fellow Michigan graduate Linda Schreiber, who became his partner in the field and in his research.

Braidwood spent World War II working for the Army Air Corps, in charge of a meteorological mapping program.  In 1943 he gained his Ph.D. from the University of Chicago, who immediately employed him, and at whose Oriental Institute and Department of Anthropology he was a professor until he retired.

There is speculation that the fictional character Abner Ravenwood, from the Indiana Jones series, was based on Braidwood.  Ravenwood was a fellow distinguished University of Chicago archaeologist known for his work in exotic locales and mentor to "Indy".  Braidwood's colleague James Henry Breasted has been cited as a possible model for Indiana Jones 

Robert John Braidwood died January 15, 2003, in Chicago. His wife Linda died the same day.

Work
The expedition to the Amuq Plain (in the state of Hatay, Turkey) was one of the first scientific archaeological surveys, involving the rigorous dating of artifacts through careful mapping and record-keeping.

In 1947, Braidwood had learned about carbon dating from his Chicago colleague Willard Libby, and he began to use the method in order to make his dating of artifacts more precise. Also in 1947 the Oriental Institute's Jarmo Project in Iraq was launched by Braidwood. It was an early example of an excavation aiming to retrieve evidence of the methods of early food production and to solve the ecological problem of its origin and early consequences.  The project brought together archaeologists, biologists, and geologists in a ground-breaking study which earned it a National Science Foundation grant in 1954 — one of the first times such an award had been made to an anthropological project. When the political situation in Iraq deteriorated, however, Braidwood was forced to leave, and he went on to carry out similar projects in Iran and Turkey.

Together with researchers from Istanbul University, Braidwood worked at a site in southern Turkey called Çayönü, and provided extensive and significance evidence for the theory that between 8,000 and 12,000 years ago there was a shift from a hunter-gatherer to an agricultural society in southern Turkey.

Braidwood is the author of "Prehistoric Men," a 181-page booklet in a series on popular topics published in 1967 by the Field Museum.

Braidwood was elected to the American Academy of Arts and Sciences in 1963, the United States National Academy of Sciences in 1964, and the American Philosophical Society in 1966. In 1971 the Archaeological Institute of America awarded him the Gold Medal Award for distinguished archaeological achievement.

Works
 Robert J. Braidwood, "Mounds in the Plain of Antioch: An Archeological Survey", Oriental Institute Publications 48, Chicago: University of Chicago Press, 1937

References

Further reading
 Daniel, Glyn Edmund; Chippindale, Christopher. The Pastmasters: Eleven Modern Pioneers of Archaeology: V. Gordon Childe, Stuart Piggott, Charles Phillips, Christopher Hawkes, Seton Lloyd, Robert J. Braidwood, Gordon R. Willey, C.J. Becker, Sigfried J. De Laet, J. Desmond Clark, D.J. Mulvaney. New York: Thames and Hudson, 1989 (hardcover).

Sources and external links
Stephen L. Brusatte, "Robert John Braidwood", in Encyclopedia of Anthropology ed. H. James Birx (2006, SAGE Publications)
University of Chicago obituary
Photograph of the Amuq Plain expedition, 1936
National Academy of Sciences Biographical Memoir

External links
 

University of Chicago faculty
University of Chicago alumni
1907 births
2003 deaths
American anthropologists
United States Army Air Forces soldiers
United States Army personnel of World War II
Taubman College of Architecture and Urban Planning alumni
American expatriates in Turkey
20th-century American archaeologists
Members of the American Philosophical Society